The National Prize for Applied and Technological Sciences was created in 1992 as one of the replacements for the National Prize for Sciences under Law 19169. The other two prizes in this same area are for Exact Sciences and Natural Sciences.

It is part of the National Prize of Chile.

Jury
The jury is made up of the Minister of Education, who calls it, two academics assigned by the Council of Rectors, the President of the National Commission for Scientific and Technological Research (CONICYT), and the last recipient of the prize.

Prize
The prize consists of:
 A diploma
 A cash prize amounting to 6,562,457 pesos which is adjusted every year, according to the previous year's consumer price index
 A pension of 20  (approximately US$1,600) in January of the corresponding year, which remains constant for the rest of the year

Winners
 1992, Raúl Sáez
 1994: 
 1996: Julio Meneghello
 1998: Fernando Mönckeberg Barros
 2000: Andrés Weintraub Pohorille
 2002: Pablo Valenzuela
 2004: Juan Asenjo
 2006: Edgar Kausel
 2008: José Miguel Aguilera
 2010: Juan Carlos Castilla
 2012: Ricardo Uauy
 2014: José Rodríguez Pérez
 2016: 
 2018:

See also

 CONICYT
 List of agriculture awards
 List of engineering awards

References

1992 establishments in Chile
Chilean science and technology awards
Invention awards
Engineering awards
Materials science awards
Agriculture awards
1992 in Chilean law